Karkhaneh-e Fakhr-e Iran (also Romanized as Kārkhāneh-e Fakhr-e Īrān; also known as Kārkhānejāt-e Fakhr-e Īrān) is a village in Jamaluddin Rural District of the Central District of Nazarabad County, Alborz province, Iran. At the 2006 census, its population was 849 in 220 households. The most recent census in 2016 counted 1,162 people in 365 households; it was the largest village in its rural district.

References 

Nazarabad County

Populated places in Alborz Province

Populated places in Nazarabad County